Harry 'Speed' Gregory (12 November 1902 – 8 January 1993) was an Australian rules footballer who played for Essendon in the Victorian Football League (VFL) during the 1920s.

As a half back flanker, Gregory appeared in all of Essendon's three finals in the one off round robin series which decided the 1924 premiership. He finished his career in the Victorian Football Association where he took the field for Coburg from late in the 1930 season until 1933. Gregory also had two brothers who played in the VFL: Bruce Gregory, and Johnny Gregory. His daughter married Ray Watts.

References
Holmesby, Russell and Main, Jim (2007). The Encyclopedia of AFL Footballers. 7th ed. Melbourne: Bas Publishing.

External links

1902 births
1993 deaths
Essendon Football Club players
Essendon Football Club Premiership players
Coburg Football Club players
Australian rules footballers from Victoria (Australia)
One-time VFL/AFL Premiership players